County Lists for Environment and Solidarity (FMS) was an electoral alliance in Norway, consisting of the Red Electoral Alliance, Communist Party of Norway, local groups and independents, which contested the 1989 parliamentary election in Norway. The alliance got 22 126 votes (0.8%), which was insufficient to win a seat.

References

Communist Party of Norway
Defunct political parties in Norway
Political parties established in 1989
Political parties with year of disestablishment missing
Red Party (Norway)
1989 establishments in Norway